Lim Hui Ying (born 1963) is a Malaysian politician who has served as the Deputy Minister of Education in the Pakatan Harapan (PH) administration under Prime Minister Anwar Ibrahim and Minister Fadhlina Sidek since December 2022 and the Member of Parliament (MP) for Tanjong since November 2022. She served as the Senator from August 2018 to her resignation in November 2022. She is a member and State Secretary of Penang of the Democratic Action Party (DAP), a component party of the PH coalition.

Election results

References 
 

Living people
1963 births
Malaysian politicians of Chinese descent
Democratic Action Party (Malaysia) politicians
Members of the Dewan Rakyat
Members of the Dewan Negara
21st-century Malaysian politicians
21st-century Malaysian women politicians
University of Malaya alumni